Oleksandr Kaydash (born 30 May 1976) is a Ukrainian former athlete who competed in the 2000 Summer Olympics.

References

1976 births
Living people
Ukrainian male sprinters
Olympic athletes of Ukraine
Athletes (track and field) at the 2000 Summer Olympics
European Athletics Championships medalists
Universiade medalists in athletics (track and field)
Universiade silver medalists for Ukraine
Medalists at the 2001 Summer Universiade